V. Krishnamurthy Gounder was an Indian politician and former Member of the Legislative Assembly of Tamil Nadu. He was elected to the Tamil Nadu legislative assembly as a Dravida Munnetra Kazhagam candidate from Nellikuppam constituency in 1962, 1971 and 1980 elections.

References 

Dravida Munnetra Kazhagam politicians
Year of birth missing
Possibly living people
Madras MLAs 1962–1967
Tamil Nadu MLAs 1971–1976
Tamil Nadu MLAs 1980–1984